The optical properties of a material define how it interacts with light. The optical properties of matter are studied in optical physics, a subfield of optics. The optical properties of matter include:
Refractive index
Dispersion
Transmittance and Transmission coefficient
Absorption
Scattering
Turbidity
Reflectance and Reflectivity (reflection coefficient)
Albedo
Perceived color
Fluorescence
Phosphorescence
Photoluminescence
Optical bistability
Dichroism
Birefringence
Optical activity
Photosensitivity

A basic distinction is between isotropic materials, which exhibit the same properties regardless of the direction of the light, and anisotropic ones, which exhibit different properties when light passes through them in different directions.

The optical properties of matter can lead to a variety of interesting optical phenomena.

Properties of specific materials
Optical properties of water and ice
Optical properties of carbon nanotubes
Crystal optics

Literature
 
 

Optics
Materials science